This is a partial list of companies which have their headquarters in St. John's, Newfoundland and Labrador

External links

 St. John's Board of Trade